The Kona 14 is an American catamaran sailing dinghy that was designed by Lyle Hess as a racer and first built in 1971.

Production
The design was built by Fiberform in the United States, starting in 1971, but it is now out of production.

Design
The Kona 14 is a recreational catamaran, built predominantly of fiberglass. It has a fractional sloop rig. The two hulls each have raked stems, a plumb transoms and transom-hung rudders controlled by a tiller. The hulls have no keel or daggerboards, instead they are curved to provide a keel-effect and to reduce leeway when sailing to windward.

The boat has a draft of  allowing operation in shallow water, beaching or ground transportation on a trailer.

A trapeze may be fitted.

See also
List of sailing boat types

Similar sailboats
Hobie 14

References

Dinghies
1970s sailboat type designs
Sailing yachts
Sailboat type designs by Lyle Hess
Sailboat types built by Fiberform